A list of films produced in Spain in 1977 (see 1977 in film).

1977

External links
 Spanish films of 1977 at the Internet Movie Database

1977
Spanish
Films